Heaven on Earth is a live album from Planetshakers. Planetshakers Ministries International and Venture3Media released the album on 19 October 2018.  They worked with Joth Hunt in the production of this album. This disc was recorded in Melbourne Indonesia, Philippines, Malaysia.

Critical reception

Joshua Andre, specifying in a four and a half star review for 365 Days of Inspiring Media, replies, "Overall an enjoyable album that has definitely continues my reinvigorated interest for Planetshakers a bit more; this unique and diverse track list has certainly created momentum, and given me new songs to sing out to Jesus during times of joy and hardship." Rating the album four and a half stars for Jesus Freak Hideout, Bert Gangl says, "The combined project also features a 10-track DVD, a slightly shorter radio edit of the title cut, and a "heavy" version of "Move Out of My Way," the former of which is largely the same as its original counterpart and the latter of which winds up as more of a parody than a tribute to the '80s pop metal idiom." Jasmin Patterson, by New Release Today, describes finally, "There are songs and moments on Heaven On The Earth for every expression of worship, from joyful praise to reverent awe and personal encounter. Whatever moment or season you find yourself in, this album will help you connect with God."

Track listing

Charts

Singles

Year-end charts

References

2018 live albums
Planetshakers albums